is a Japanese term for specialty food products associated with particular Japanese regions. Tokusanhin are often showcased in ekiben and packaged as omiyage (souvenirs).

Tokusanhin are a category of meibutsu, regional specialties.

Examples 

 Akita
 Kiritanpo Nabe
 Fukuoka
 Mentaiko
 Fukushima
 Fukushima beef
 Ikaninjin
 Kitakata ramen
 Hiroshima
 Momiji manjū
 Hokkaido
 Shiroi Koibito
 Royce'
 Kanagawa
 Hato Sabure
 Kobe
 Castella
 Fugetsudo
 Kyoto
 Yatsuhashi
 Mie
 Spiny lobster
 Matsusaka beef
 Nagoya
 Hatcho miso
 Niigata
 Noppe
 Sasa dango
 Osaka
 Takoyaki
 Okonomiyaki
 Chinsuko
 Shiga
 Ōmi beef
 Shikoku
 Sanuki udon
 Tokyo
 Tokyo Banana
 Yokohama Baumkuchen
 Yamagata
 Imoni
 Yonezawa beef

See also 
Meibutsu, famous things, usually associated with particular locales.
Miyagegashi
Pasalubong, a gifting tradition in the Philippines also involving regional specialties

References

Japanese cuisine
Japanese words and phrases
Japanese cuisine-related lists
Tourism in Japan
Japanese popular culture
Memorabilia